Bradley P. Stoner (born December 24, 1959) is an American sociocultural anthropologist and Head of the Department of Public Health Sciences at Queen's University. He is the former president of the American Sexually Transmitted Diseases Association and is regarded as an expert on the study of sexually transmitted infections.

Education 
Stoner graduated magna cum laude in anthropology from Harvard University in 1981 with an A.B. having studied biological anthropology. He then pursued master's degrees in medical anthropology and bioanthropology from McGill University on the William Lyon Mackenzie King Scholarship and Indiana University, respectively. He then attended Indiana University for medical school, earning his MD in 1987 and his PhD in anthropology in 1989. In 1987, he spent a year in Peru as a Fulbright Scholar conducting field research. His dissertation was titled, "Health Care Delivery and Health Resource Utilization in a Highland Andean Community of Southern Peru."

Stoner began his postgraduate medical training in internal medicine at Duke University in 1988. Graduating three years later, he completed a senior research fellowship in infectious diseases at the University of Washington between 1991 and 1994.

Career 
While at the University of Washington for his senior research fellowship, Stoner worked as a research associate in the Department of Anthropology. In 1994, he also served as an acting instructor in the Division of Allergy and Infectious Diseases at the University of Washington School of Medicine.

In 1995, upon completion of his research fellowship, Stoner moved to St. Louis to hold a dual assistant professorships in the Division of Infectious Diseases in Department of Internal Medicine at the Washington University School of Medicine and Department of Anthropology in the Washington University in St. Louis Faculty of Arts and Sciences. In 2001, he was awarded a dual associate professorship in the same departments. In 1995, he also became the medical director of the St. Louis STD/HIV Prevention Training Center. From 1995 to 2006, Stoner served as Chief of STD Services for the St. Louis County Department of Health. In 2019, he was named Co-Director of the Midwest Center for Capacity Building Assistance for HIV Prevention.

Between 2004 and 2005, Stoner worked at the World Health Organization in Geneva as a visiting medical officer in the Department of HIV and the Department of Reproductive Health and Research.

From 2017 to 2021, Stoner served first as a Member, and then as Co-Chair, of the Centers for Disease Control and Prevention (CDC) and Health Resources and Services Administration (HRSA) Advisory Committee on HIV, Viral Hepatitis, and STD Prevention and Treatment (CHAC).

In May 2020, while an associate professor of medicine and anthropology at Washington University School of Medicine and Washington University in St. Louis, Stoner was recruited by Queen's University and appointed as Professor and Head of the Department of Public Health Sciences for the Faculty of Health Sciences, with cross-appointment as Professor of Medicine (Division of Infectious Diseases). His appointment became official on October 1st, 2020.

Research 
Stoner has research interests in the comparative epidemiology of sexually transmitted infections, the social formation of sickness and health, and medical decision-making and health care utilization. He also conducts research in the United States and Peru on the sociocultural aspects of STD control, specifically into the analysis of sex partner networks, and patient perception of symptoms and subsequent health-seeking responses. He uses anthropology-based ethnographic approaches in his research to address STD/HIV transmission, specifically advances in epidemiology and mathematical modeling.

Honors and awards 
In 1985, Stoner was awarded the W.H.R. Rivers Student Prize from the Society for Medical Anthropology. In 1987, he was the recipient of a Fulbright Scholarship for work he conducted in Peru. In 1991, Stoner was awarded a Senior Research Fellowship from the National Institutes of Health.

In 2012, Stoner was elected president of American Sexually Transmitted Diseases Association for a two-year term. During his presidency, Stoner led the changing of the name of the association's lifetime achievement award from the "Thomas Parran Award" due to Parran's association with the notorious Tuskegee syphilis experiment and Guatemala syphilis experiment in the 1930s and 1940s as Surgeon General of the United States.

References 

American anthropologists
American venereologists
1959 births
Living people
Harvard College alumni
McGill University Faculty of Medicine alumni
Indiana University School of Medicine alumni
Washington University School of Medicine faculty
Washington University in St. Louis faculty
McGill University alumni